Alisha Chinoy is an Indian singer. her songs list is given below:

Hindi film songs

1980s

1990s

2000s

2010s

Regional songs

References

Lists of songs recorded by Indian singers